= Gwinnett's Fallen Heroes Memorial =

Coordinates: 33.95381°N 83.99258°W

Gwinnett's Fallen Heroes Memorial is located at 75 Langely Drive in Lawrenceville, Georgia, and was dedicated on Memorial Day 2003. It honors Gwinnett County soldiers, police and firefighters who died in the line of duty.

The memorial honors roughly 700 people, organized by categories of service. Their names, in random order and without rank, are carved on 13 black granite markers that are nine feet tall. A central pedestal holds a Vic McCallum bronze sculpture of an eagle carrying a "Remembrance" rose.
